La Selle-en-Coglès (pronounced as La Selle-en-Cogles) is a former commune in the Ille-et-Vilaine department in Brittany in northwestern France. On 1 January 2017, it was merged into the new commune Les Portes du Coglais.

Population
Inhabitants of La Selle-en-Coglès are called Cellois in French.

See also
Communes of the Ille-et-Vilaine department

References

External links

Former communes of Ille-et-Vilaine